= F. N. Zabriskie =

American theologian, essayist, and churchman

Francis Nicoll Zabriskie (1810–1881) was an American theologian, essayist and churchman.

He also wrote under the pseudonym "Old Colony".
